István Vituska (born 25 August 1988) is a Hungarian footballer who currently plays as a midfielder for Kozármisleny SE.

References

External links
Profile at hlsz.hu
MLSZ

1988 births
Living people
People from Szekszárd
Hungarian footballers
Association football midfielders
Újpest FC players
Lombard-Pápa TFC footballers
Szekszárdi UFC footballers
Kozármisleny SE footballers
Nemzeti Bajnokság I players
Hungarian expatriate footballers
Expatriate footballers in Austria
Hungarian expatriate sportspeople in Austria
Sportspeople from Tolna County